Hazza' Barakat al-Majali (1917 – 29 August 1960) was a Jordanian politician that served as the two-time 11th Prime Minister of Jordan. His first term lasted one week in 1955, his second term lasted from mid-1959 until his assassination.

Education
Majali was born in Madaba, the Karak governorate in 1917. He was the son of a sheikh of the Majali tribe. He attended an elementary school in Ma'een, then transferred to Al-Raba School in Al-Karak, followed by Al-Karak School, and finally to Al-Salt school for his secondary education. Hazza' later studied Law in Damascus.

Jordanian government positions

After high school, Majali worked for the Department of Land and Survey followed by the Madaba Court. After that, he studied Law in Damascus and returned to Jordan to work for the "Royal Protocol". He was appointed by King Abdullah I as Chairman of the Greater Amman Municipality, then served as the Minister of Agriculture (1950–1951) and as the Minister of Justice (1951 and 1954–1955) under Prime Minister Sameer al-Rifai. He won two Parliamentary elections to represent Al-Karak in the Jordanian Parliament, once in 1951 and again in 1954. He was also appointed as the Minister of Interior (1953–1954 and 1955). Hazza' first served as Prime Minister on 15 December 1955 when King Hussein tried to join the Baghdad Pact, but quickly resigned on 20 December 1955 following popular protests making his first government the shortest lasting government in Jordan's history. He was re-appointed as Prime Minister on 6 May 1959. He picked Wasfi al-Tal to be his assistant during this term. Majali was assassinated at his office on 29 August 1960.

Assassination

At around 10:30 am on 29 August 1960, a bomb exploded in Majali's office, killing him and 11 other people including senior officials in the government. The assassins targeted al-Majali in his regular weekly meetings that he regularly held on Mondays to listen to the complaints of Jordanian citizens and propose possible solutions to their grievances. A number of those who had come to meet him also perished in the explosion. A number of convicts allegedly involved in Majali's assassination were hanged on 31 December 1960.

Personal life
Majali married Samiha Rfifan al-Majali, the sister of Habis al-Majali. Together they had 5 children (3 boys and 2 girls). His eldest son, Amjad Hazza' al-Majali, served as the Jordanian Ambassador in Bahrain and Greece, and eventually became Minister of Labor during the government of Ali Abu al-Ragheb. His second eldest son, Ayman Hazza' al-Majali, served as Chief of Royal Protocol for King Hussein in the 1990s until the King's death in 1999, and then served as Deputy Prime Minister during the government of Abdelraouf al-Rawabdeh. His eldest daughter, Taghrid Hazza' Majali, married Prince Muhammad bin Talal, brother of King Hussein, in 1981. His second eldest daughter Zein Hazza' Majali is a businesswoman. His youngest son, Hussein Hazza' al-Majali, who graduated from The Citadel, The Military College of South Carolina, served in the Jordanian military and became head of the Royal Guard under King Hussein in the 1990s, Jordan's Ambassador in Bahrain until 2010 the chief of the Jordanian Public Security Department. And the minister of Interior Affairs in the government of Abdullah Al Nsour.

See also
 List of prime ministers of Jordan
 Abdelsalam al-Majali

References

1917 births
1960 deaths
Damascus University alumni
20th-century Jordanian lawyers
Government ministers of Jordan
Agriculture ministers of Jordan
Justice ministers of Jordan
Members of the Senate of Jordan
Members of the House of Representatives (Jordan)
Interior ministers of Jordan
Foreign ministers of Jordan
Economy ministers of Jordan
Majali
People murdered in Jordan
Assassinated heads of government
Assassinated Jordanian politicians
20th-century economists
Mayors of Amman
1960 in Jordan
1960s murders in Jordan
1960 crimes in Jordan
1960 murders in Asia
August 1960 events in Asia